Syntypistis victor is a species of moth of the family Notodontidae first described by Alexander Schintlmeister and Cheng-Lai Fang in 2001. It is found in the Chinese provinces of Beijing, Liaoning, Hubei and Shaanxi.

References

Moths described in 2001
Notodontidae